Karlton is a variant spelling of Carlton. It may refer to:

People
Karlton Hester, American musician and educator
Karlton Rolle, Bahamian sprinter
Karlton Rosholt, American journalist
Lawrence K. Karlton, American judge

Other uses
Karlton Theatre, American non-profit theatrical producing organization